Chemult  is an unincorporated community in Klamath County, Oregon, United States, on U.S. Route 97 near the drainage divide between the Klamath and Columbia Rivers. Chemult has a population of about 300 people.

The locale was originally established in 1924 as a station on the Southern Pacific Cascade Line named "Knott" during construction. The station's name was changed to Chemult when the line opened in 1926 and a post office was established the same year. The name Chemult comes from a Klamath chief who was one of the 26 who signed the Klamath Lake Treaty of October 14, 1864.

Amtrak's Coast Starlight stops in Chemult daily at the Chemult Amtrak station, and Pacific Crest Bus Lines stops daily at the station on its route from Klamath Falls to Bend. There is also a Winema National Forest ranger station within the community.

The area around Chemult is commonly used for hiking, snowmobiling, cross-country skiing, dog sled racing, fishing, and hunting. Chemult also offers the annual Sled Dog Races where mushers come to race their sled dogs and compete for cash prizes.

Demographics

Climate
Chemult has the typical continental Mediterranean climate (Köppen Dsb) of the more humid parts of the Intermountain West, featuring dry summers with large diurnal temperature swings and cold winters with cycles of heavy snowfall and dry spells. Typically eighteen days will fail to hit  and ten nights fall below , whilst in December and January only three days exceed .

References

External links 

Chemult Community Action Team Webpage

Unincorporated communities in Klamath County, Oregon
1924 establishments in Oregon
Unincorporated communities in Oregon
Populated places established in 1924
Oregon placenames of Native American origin